Lakiro, is a 2023 Gujarati film directed by Darshan Ashwin Trivedi, starring Deeksha Joshi, Raunaq Kamdar, Netri Trivedi, Shivani Joshi and Vishal Shah.

Synopsis
Richa and Hrishi, both millennials, cross paths while studying in Pune. Richa is doing her Ph.D. in HR Management, while Hrishi is doing his MBA in finance. It was love at first sight for both of them, culminating in marriage as soon as they were done studying. Hrishi was the typical ambitious male and landed a job as an investment banker. His ambition drives him away from Richa, making her feel lonely and depressed. Richa feels compelled to take up a job, pursue her career, and join a startup as an HR consultant. Hrishi is unhappy as he feels she should be a homemaker and wants a baby. Like most working couples today, their careers slowly start to create a divide. Things turn so ugly that they eventually decide to file for divorce. Coincidentally their divorce happens on Richa's birthday, and circumstances compel Hrishi to attend Richa's birthday party the same night. Strange is the human heart, and destiny is never in our hands. At the party, something unusual happens between Hrishi and Richa.

Cast
 Deeksha Joshi as Richa
 Raunaq Kamdar as Hrishi
 Netri Trivedi as Saumya
 Nisarg Trivedi as Hrishi's father
 Shivani Joshi as Kavya
 Vishal Shah as Nikhil
 Dharmesh Vyas as Mr. Mehta
 Diana Rawal as Richa's mother
 Hitesh Thakar as Shankarbhai
 Makrand Shukla as Dr. Shrivastava

Production
The shooting of the film was started in November 2021. The film has been filmed in Ahmedabad, with other locations including Bangalore, Pune, and Mumbai. Initially, Lakiro was scheduled for theatrical release on 25 November 2022, but postponed. It is scheduled for theatrical release on 6 January 2023.

Soundtrack

The music for Lakiro is composed by Parth Bharat Thakkar. The songs of the film have been sung by Amit Trivedi, Vishal Dadlani, Shilpa Rao, Shalmali Kholgade, Benny Dayal, Shruti Pathak, and Thakkar. The soundtrack will be released in Gujrati and Hindi languages. The Gujarati lyrics are written by Chirag Tripathi and Tushar Shukla while Hindi lyrics are written by Amitabh Verma. The album will be released by Warner Music India.

Reception

References

External links
 

Upcoming films
2020s Gujarati-language films
Films set in Ahmedabad
Films shot in Ahmedabad
Films shot in Gujarat